This is a list of events that occurred in the year 2000 in Bulgaria.

Incumbents 
 President: Petar Stoyanov
 Prime Minister: Simeon Sakskoburggotski

Events

Sports
31 May - 2000 Bulgarian Cup Final

Births

 April 7 - Ivan Ivanov, singer and songwriter

Deaths
3 April - Milko Bobotsov, chess grandmaster

References

 
Years of the 20th century in Bulgaria
2000s in Bulgaria
Bulgaria
Bulgaria